Hulcott  is a village and civil parish in Aylesbury Vale district in Buckinghamshire, England. It is north of Aylesbury, off the road that runs between Bierton and Rowsham. It is in the civil parish of Bierton with Broughton

The village toponym is derived from the Old English for "hovel-like cottage". In the manorial records of 1200 it was recorded as Hoccote.  Up to the 17th century the village name was pronounced .

The manor at Hulcott has, for a long time, been part of the manorial district of Aylesbury. In the Domesday Book of 1086 the village's returns were included with those of the nearby town and as such are indistinguishable from them. It is, however, a separate civil parish.

The village is arranged around a traditional village green. In recent times the main A418 road has been rerouted so that it no longer runs through the village. Recently a new golf club opened on land adjacent to the village.

The Church of England parish church of All Saints has an early 14th-century chancel arch.

References

External links
 

Villages in Buckinghamshire
Civil parishes in Buckinghamshire